The Moirang Kangleirol, also spelled Moilang Kangleilol, is a body of history, literature, folklore, mythology, legends and other accounts originally associated with the ancient kingdom of Kege Moirang.

In a general sense, the terms Keke, Moirang and Ngangoi are used synonymously since ancient times to refer to the ancient kingdom.

History 
Keke Kangla was the capital city of the ancient Moirang kingdom. It's a place of political administration as well as religious practices. People of the kingdom used to perform annual sacred ceremonies in the city.
The Moirang Ningthourol (genealogy of the rulers of Moirang) was calculated with reference to many ancient manuscripts, including the Cheitharol Kumpapa.

Mythology 
The mythology associated with Moirang Kangleirol has a diverse range of accounts. 
There are Phamlons of deities. The nine gods and the nine goddesses participated in the divine harvesting festival of Thangjing Loutaba. They are collectively called the Laibungthous and the Laibenthous respectively.

Legends 
The Moirang Shayon legends from the backbone of the Moirang Kangleirol. "Moirang Shayon" (lit. Moirang incarnations) is a genre of the seven incarnations of a God and a Goddess, induced under the direction of Lord Thangjing, in the ancient Moirang kingdom.
The list of the seven pairs of incarnations are:

References 

Legends
Meitei mythology
Meitei folklore
Meitei literature
Meitei culture
History of Manipur
Pages with unreviewed translations